Tom Nielsen is a Danish curler.

At the national level, he is a three-time Danish men's champion curler (1993, 1994, 1995).

Teams

References

External links

Living people
Danish male curlers
Danish curling champions
Year of birth missing (living people)
Place of birth missing (living people)